Bergvliet is a suburb of Cape Town, South Africa. Bergvliet, which means "Mountain Streamlet" in Afrikaans, is bordered by Retreat, Meadowridge, Tokai, and Heathfield.

Bergvliet is home to three schools: Bergvliet High School, Bergvliet Primary School, and Sweet Valley Primary School. All three of these schools were built in the late 1940s and early 1950s. There is a very active neighbourhood watch called BKM which stands for Bergvliet, Kreupelbosch and Meadowridge which has grown to include other neighbourhoods over the years. The rate payers association BMRA is also very active and fights to protect and develop the area. The suburb is close to good hospitals and shopping centers.

History 
Bergvliet was formerly a large farm owned by Simon van der Stel which was part of the original Constantia farm. The original farmhouse of Cape Dutch design still stands on a large property on the Western border of Bergvliet. The Bergvliet Farm, as it is known, is a very beautiful place with a small natural pond which is also a tiny bird sanctuary. The farm is also a favorite dog walking and running location. The original farm was made into a residential suburb for returning South African servicemen from World War II.

Demographics
According to the 2011 Census, the population of Bergvliet was 4,428. The following tables show various demographic data about Bergvliet from that census.

Gender

Ethnic Group

Home Language

References

Suburbs of Cape Town